The following outline is provided as an overview and topical guide to Gabon (the Gabonese Republic):

Gabon – country in west central Africa sharing borders with the Gulf of Guinea to the west, Equatorial Guinea to the northwest, and Cameroon to the north, with the Republic of the Congo curving around the east and south. The small population density together with abundant natural resources and foreign private investment have helped make Gabon one of the most prosperous countries in the region, with the highest HDI in Sub-Saharan Africa.

General reference

 Pronunciation: 
 Common English country name:  Gabon
 Official English country name:  The Gabonese Republic
 Common endonym(s):  
 Official endonym(s):  
 Adjectival(s): Gabonese
 ISO country codes:  GA, GAB, 266
 ISO region codes:  See ISO 3166-2:GA
 Internet country code top-level domain:  .ga

Geography of Gabon 

Geography of Gabon
 Gabon is: a country
 Location:
 Eastern Hemisphere, on the Equator
 Africa
 Middle Africa
 Time zone:  West Africa Time (UTC+01)
 Extreme points of Gabon
 High:  Mont Bengoué 
 Low:  Atlantic Ocean 0 m
 Land boundaries:  2,551 km
 1,903 km
 350 km
 298 km
 Coastline:  South Atlantic Ocean 885 km
 Population of Gabon: 2,172,579  - 142nd most populous country

 Area of Gabon:
 Total: 267,667 km2
Land: 257,667 km2
Water: 10,000 km2
Atlas of Gabon

Environment of Gabon 

 Climate of Gabon
 List of ecoregions in Gabon
 List of national parks of Gabon
 Wildlife of Gabon
 List of birds of Gabon
 List of mammals of Gabon

Natural geographic features of Gabon 

 Glaciers in Gabon: none 
 List of rivers of Gabon
 World Heritage Sites in Gabon

Regions of Gabon 

Regions of Gabon

Ecoregions of Gabon 

List of ecoregions in Gabon

Administrative divisions of Gabon 

Administrative divisions of Gabon

Provinces of Gabon 

Provinces of Gabon

Departments of Gabon 

Departments of Gabon

Municipalities of Gabon 
 Capital of Gabon: Libreville
 Cities of Gabon

Demography of Gabon 

Demographics of Gabon

Government and politics of Gabon 

Politics of Gabon
 Form of government: presidential republic
 Capital of Gabon: Libreville
 Elections in Gabon
 List of political parties in Gabon

Branches of the government of Gabon

Executive branch of the government of Gabon 
 Head of state: President of Gabon,
 Head of government: Prime Minister of Gabon,

Legislative branch of the government of Gabon 
 Parliament of Gabon (bicameral)
 Upper house: Senate of Gabon
 Lower house: House of Commons of Gabon

Judicial branch of the government of Gabon 

Court system of Gabon

Foreign relations of Gabon 

Foreign relations of Gabon
 Diplomatic missions in Gabon
 Diplomatic missions of Gabon
 United States-Gabon relations

International organization membership
The Gabonese Republic is a member of:

African, Caribbean, and Pacific Group of States (ACP)
African Development Bank Group (AfDB)
African Union (AU)
African Union/United Nations Hybrid operation in Darfur (UNAMID)
Commonwealth of Nations
Conference des Ministres des Finances des Pays de la Zone Franc (FZ)
Development Bank of Central African States (BDEAC)
Economic and Monetary Community of Central Africa (CEMAC)
Food and Agriculture Organization (FAO)
Group of 24 (G24)
Group of 77 (G77)
International Atomic Energy Agency (IAEA)
International Bank for Reconstruction and Development (IBRD)
International Civil Aviation Organization (ICAO)
International Criminal Court (ICCt)
International Criminal Police Organization (Interpol)
International Development Association (IDA)
International Federation of Red Cross and Red Crescent Societies (IFRCS)
International Finance Corporation (IFC)
International Fund for Agricultural Development (IFAD)
International Labour Organization (ILO)
International Maritime Organization (IMO)
International Mobile Satellite Organization (IMSO)
International Monetary Fund (IMF)
International Olympic Committee (IOC)
International Organization for Migration (IOM)
International Organization for Standardization (ISO) (correspondent)

International Red Cross and Red Crescent Movement (ICRM)
International Telecommunication Union (ITU)
International Telecommunications Satellite Organization (ITSO)
International Trade Union Confederation (ITUC)
Inter-Parliamentary Union (IPU)
Islamic Development Bank (IDB)
Multilateral Investment Guarantee Agency (MIGA)
Nonaligned Movement (NAM)
Organisation internationale de la Francophonie (OIF)
Organisation of Islamic Cooperation (OIC)
Organisation for the Prohibition of Chemical Weapons (OPCW)
Organization of the Petroleum Exporting Countries (OPEC)
United Nations (UN)
United Nations Conference on Trade and Development (UNCTAD)
United Nations Educational, Scientific, and Cultural Organization (UNESCO)
United Nations Industrial Development Organization (UNIDO)
United Nations Mission in the Central African Republic and Chad (MINURCAT)
United Nations Mission in the Sudan (UNMIS)
Universal Postal Union (UPU)
World Confederation of Labour (WCL)
World Customs Organization (WCO)
World Federation of Trade Unions (WFTU)
World Health Organization (WHO)
World Intellectual Property Organization (WIPO)
World Meteorological Organization (WMO)
World Tourism Organization (UNWTO)
World Trade Organization (WTO)

Law and order in Gabon 
 LGBT rights in Gabon
 Law enforcement in Gabon

Military of Gabon 

Military of Gabon
 Forces
 Army of Gabon
 Air Force of Gabon

Local government in Gabon 

Local government in Gabon

History of Gabon 

History of Gabon
Current events of Gabon

Culture of Gabon 

Culture of Gabon
 Cuisine of Gabon
 Languages of Gabon
 National symbols of Gabon
 Coat of arms of Gabon
 Flag of Gabon
 National anthem of Gabon
 Public holidays in Gabon
 Religion in Gabon
 Hinduism in Gabon
 Islam in Gabon
 World Heritage Sites in Gabon

Art in Gabon 
 Music of Gabon

Sports in Gabon 

Sports in Gabon
 Football in Gabon
 Gabon at the Olympics

Economy and infrastructure of Gabon 

Economy of Gabon
 Economic rank, by nominal GDP (2007): 108th (one hundred and eighth)
 Agriculture in Gabon
 Communications in Gabon
 Internet in Gabon
 Companies of Gabon
Currency of Gabon: Franc
ISO 4217: XAF
 Energy in Gabon
 Health care in Gabon
 Mining in Gabon
 Tourism in Gabon
 Transport in Gabon
 List of airports in Gabon
 Rail transport in Gabon
 Roads in Gabon

Education in Gabon 

Education in Gabon

Health in Gabon 

Health in Gabon

See also

Index of Gabon-related articles
List of international rankings
Member state of the United Nations
Outline of Africa
Outline of geography

References

External links

Gabon
Gabon